Johannes Ittmann (26 January 1885 – 15 June 1963) was a German Protestant missionary in Cameroon between 1911 and 1940. 

He was born in Groß-Umstadt, Grand Duchy of Hesse, German Empire and died in Gambach, Hesse, West Germany.

He did extensive ethnological and anthropological work in the Southwest Province, an English-speaking part of Cameroon, and published some 1,000 pages about it. His best-known work is his dictionary about the Duala language.

References

External links

unpublished manuscripts and free literature

1885 births
1963 deaths
People from Groß-Umstadt
German Protestant missionaries
People from the Grand Duchy of Hesse
Protestant missionaries in Cameroon
German expatriates in Cameroon